Jesús Aguirre (26 July 1902 – 23 April 1954) was a Mexican athlete. He competed in the men's shot put at the 1924 Summer Olympics and the 1928 Summer Olympics.

References

External links
 

1902 births
1954 deaths
Athletes (track and field) at the 1924 Summer Olympics
Athletes (track and field) at the 1928 Summer Olympics
Mexican male shot putters
Mexican male discus throwers
Olympic athletes of Mexico
Central American and Caribbean Games medalists in athletics
Sportspeople from Chihuahua (state)